The following is a list of all team-to-team transactions that have occurred in the National Hockey League (NHL) during the 1947–48 NHL season. It lists which team each player has been traded to and for which player(s) or other consideration(s), if applicable.

Transactions 

Notes
 Trade voided when Conacher refused to report to the Rangers.
 Trade completed in June 1948 (exact date unknown).

References

Transactions
National Hockey League transactions